The Agremiación de Futbolistas Profesionales del Perú, generally referred to as SAFAP, is a sports union for football players. Its headquarters are in Peru. SAFAP has Roberto Silva and Fernando Revilla as the President and General Manager respectively.

History

SAFAP was formed in 2001 in response to a need to defend the rights of professional football players in Peru who are treated unfairly by employers such as football clubs.

See also
Football in Peru

References 

2001 establishments in Peru
Association football trade unions
Trade unions in Peru